Xəsədərli (also, Xasadarlı and Khasadarly) is a village in the Goranboy Rayon of Azerbaijan.  The village forms part of the municipality of Səmədabad.

References

External Links 

Populated places in Goranboy District